Larouche is a municipality in Quebec, Canada, part of Le Fjord-du-Saguenay Regional County Municipality. It is located along Quebec Route 170 between Jonquière and Saint-Bruno, just south of the Saguenay River.

History
In the early 1910s, several families settled in the area. In 1911, the settlement got its post office and in 1922, the Parish Municipality of Larouche was incorporated, named after William Larouche (1835-1917), a pioneer who was among the area's first settlers.

In 2000, the parish municipality changed its status to municipality.

Demographics
Population trend:
 Population in 2016: 1486 (2011 to 2016 population change: 16.4%)
 Population in 2011: 1277 (2006 to 2011 population change: 6.4%)
 Population in 2006: 1200
 Population in 2001: 1050
 Population in 1996: 1049
 Population in 1991: 1004

Private dwellings occupied by usual residents: 637 (total dwellings: 778)

Mother tongue:
 English as first language: 0.3%
 French as first language: 99.3%
 English and French as first language: 0%
 Other as first language: 0.3%

References

External links

Municipalities in Quebec
Incorporated places in Saguenay–Lac-Saint-Jean